This is an overview of the progression of the world track cycling record of the men's 500 m flying start as recognised by the Union Cycliste Internationale.

Progression

Professionals (1955–1992)

Amateurs (1954–1990)

Open (from 1988)

References

Track cycling world record progressions